Beefalo constitute a hybrid offspring of domestic cattle (Bos taurus), usually a male in managed breeding programs, and the American bison (Bison bison), usually a female in managed breeding programs. The breed was created to combine the characteristics of both animals for beef production.

Beefalo are primarily cattle in genetics and appearance, with the breed association defining a full Beefalo as one with three-eighths (37.5%) bison genetics, while animals with higher percentages of bison genetics are called "bison hybrids".

History 
Accidental crosses were noticed as long ago as 1749 in the Southern states of North America, during British colonization. Cattle and bison were first intentionally crossbred during the mid-19th century.

One of the first efforts to cross-breed bison and domestic cattle was in 1815 by Mr. Robert Wickliffe of Lexington, Kentucky. Mr. Robert Wickliffe's experiments continued for up to 30 years.

Another early deliberate attempt to cross-breed bison with cattle was made by Colonel Samuel Bedson, warden of Stoney Mountain Penitentiary, Winnipeg, in 1880. Bedson bought eight bison from a captive herd of James McKay and inter-bred them with Durham cattle. The hybrids raised by Bedson were described by naturalist Ernest Thompson Seton:

After seeing thousands of cattle die in a blizzard in 1886, Charles "Buffalo" Jones, a co-founder of Garden City, Kansas, also worked to cross bison and cattle at a ranch near the future Grand Canyon National Park, with the hope the animals could survive the harsh winters.  He called the result "cattalo" in 1888. Mossom Martin Boyd of Bobcaygeon, Ontario first started the practice in Canada, publishing about some of his outcomes in the Journal of Heredity. After his death in 1914, the Canadian government continued experiments in crossbreeding up to 1964, with little success. For example, in 1936 the Canadian government had successfully cross-bred only 30 cattalos.

It was found early on that crossing a male bison with a domestic cow would produce few offspring, but that crossing a domestic bull with a bison cow apparently solved the problem. The female offspring proved fertile, but rarely so for the males. Although the cattalo performed well, the mating problems meant the breeder had to maintain a herd of wild and difficult-to-handle bison cows.

In 1965, Jim Burnett of Montana produced a hybrid bull that was fertile. Soon after, Cory Skowronek of California formed the World Beefalo Association and began marketing the hybrids as a new breed. The new name, Beefalo, was meant to separate this hybrid from the problems associated with the old cattalo hybrids.  The breed was eventually set at being genetically at least five-eighths Bos taurus and at most three-eighths Bison bison.

Nutrition characteristics
A United States Department of Agriculture study found Beefalo meat, like bison meat, to be lower in fat and cholesterol than standard beef cattle.

Registration 
In 1983, the three main Beefalo registration groups reorganized under the American Beefalo World Registry. Until November 2008, there were two Beefalo associations, the American Beefalo World Registry and American Beefalo International. These organizations jointly formed the American Beefalo Association, Inc., which currently operates as the registering body for Beefalo in the United States.

Effect on bison conservation 

Most current bison herds are “genetically polluted”, meaning that they are partly crossbred with cattle. There are only four genetically unmixed American bison herds left, and only two that are also free of brucellosis: the Wind Cave bison herd that roams Wind Cave National Park, South Dakota; and the Henry Mountains herd in the Henry Mountains of Utah.

Dr. Dirk Van Vuren, formerly of the University of Kansas, however, points out that "The bison today that carry cattle DNA look exactly like bison, function exactly like bison and in fact are bison. For conservation groups, the interest is that they are not totally pure."

Cattalo 
The term "cattalo", a portmanteau of cattle and buffalo, is defined by United States law as a cross of bison and cattle which have a bison appearance.

In some American states, cattalo are regulated as "exotic animals", along with pure bison and deer. However, in most states, bison and hybrids which are raised solely for livestock purposes similar to cattle, are considered domestic animals like cattle, and do not require special permits.

See also 
 American Breed
 Bovid hybrid
 Buddy the Beefalo
 Dzo
 Haldane's rule
 Yakalo
 Żubroń

References

External links 
 Kansas State Historical Society
 The Story of Cattalo. Canadian Geographic

Beef
Cattle breeds originating in Canada
Cattle breeds originating in the United States
Cattle crossbreeds
Intergeneric hybrids